Maryland's Legislative District 17 is one of 47 districts in the state for the Maryland General Assembly. It covers part of Montgomery County.

Demographic characteristics
As of the 2020 United States census, the district had a population of 142,567, of whom 111,177 (78.0%) were of voting age. The racial makeup of the district was 57,733 (40.5%) White, 19,939 (14.0%) African American, 1,096 (0.8%) Native American, 28,795 (20.2%) Asian, 31 (0.0%) Pacific Islander, 18,519 (13.0%) from some other race, and 16,362 (11.5%) from two or more races. Hispanic or Latino of any race were 33,170 (23.3%) of the population.

The district had 80,488 registered voters as of October 17, 2020, of whom 19,436 (24.1%) were registered as unaffiliated, 11,993 (14.9%) were registered as Republicans, 47,800 (59.4%) were registered as Democrats, and 791 (1.0%) were registered to other parties.

Political representation
The district is represented for the 2023–2027 legislative term in the State Senate by Cheryl C. Kagan (D) and in the House of Delegates by Kumar P. Barve (D), Joe Vogel (D) and Julie Palakovich Carr (D).

References

Montgomery County, Maryland
17
17